15th SFFCC Awards
December 11, 2016

Picture: 
Moonlight

Animated Feature: 
The Red Turtle

Documentary: 
I Am Not Your Negro

Foreign Language Picture: 
The Handmaiden

The 15th San Francisco Film Critics Circle Awards, honoring the best in film for 2016, were given on December 11, 2016.

Winners

These are the nominees for the 15th SFFCC Awards. Winners are listed at the top of each list:

Special awards

Special Citation Award for under-appreciated independent cinema
 The Fits

Marlon Riggs Award for courage & vision in the Bay Area film community
 Joshua Grannell (a.k.a. Peaches Christ)

References

External links
 The San Francisco Film Critics Circle

San Francisco Film Critics Circle Awards
2016 film awards
2016 in San Francisco